Brigadier Dame Helen Shiels Gillespie,  (26 March 1898 – 25 August 1974) was a British military nurse, matron and nursing administrator. She served as Matron-in-Chief of Queen Alexandra's Royal Army Nursing Corps from 1952 to 1956, and was Honorary Nursing Sister to The Queen.

Early life
Gillespie was born in Edinburgh, Scotland, on 26 March 1898 to Isabella (née Dunlop) and John Gillespie. She attended George Watson's Ladies' College, before going on to study nursing at the Western Infirmary in Glasgow from 1921 to 1925.

Nursing career
In 1926, Gillespie joined Queen Alexandra's Imperial Military Nursing Service and served in India from 1927 to 1932, and again from 1934 to 1939.

During the Second World War she served in the Middle East and Southeast Asia. After the war she worked in the War Office and the British Army on the Rhine. She was awarded the Royal Red Cross in 1947.

From 1952 until her retirement on 31 July 1956 on completion of her term, Gillespie served as Matron-in-Chief of Queen Alexandra's Royal Army Nursing Corps (QARANC). She was appointed Honorary Nursing Sister to The Queen on 25 June 1952, succeeding Dame Anne Thomson.

Gillespie was appointed a Dame Commander of the Order of the British Empire in 1954.

References

External links
Queen Alexandra's Royal Army Nursing Corps website
National Portrait Gallery site

1898 births
1974 deaths
Queen Alexandra's Royal Army Nursing Corps officers
British Army personnel of World War II
British nursing administrators
British women in World War II
Dames Commander of the Order of the British Empire
Members of the Royal Red Cross
Military personnel from Edinburgh
Scottish nurses
British Army brigadiers